Coptodon bemini is a critically endangered species of fish in the cichlid family. It is endemic to Lake Bermin in Cameroon. It is threatened by pollution and sedimentation from human activities, and potentially also by large emissions of carbon dioxide (CO2) from the lake's bottom (compare Lake Nyos), although Bermin is too shallow to contain very high amounts of this gas.

References

bemini
Fish of Cameroon
Endemic fauna of Cameroon
Lake fish of Africa
Fish described in 1972
Taxonomy articles created by Polbot
Taxobox binomials not recognized by IUCN